Rudner is a surname. Notable people with the surname include:

Rita Rudner (born 1953), American comedian
Sara Rudner (born 1944), American dancer and choreographer

See also
Rudder (surname)

English-language surnames